Ruben Samuel Fleischer (born October 31, 1974) is an American film director, film producer, television producer, music video director, and commercial director who lives in Montclair, New Jersey. He is best known as the director of Zombieland (2009), his first feature film, and its sequel Zombieland: Double Tap (2019). He has also directed the films 30 Minutes or Less, Gangster Squad, Uncharted, and 2018's Venom featuring the Marvel Comics character of the same name. Prior to features, he directed television commercials for such brands as Cisco, Eurostar, ESPN, and Burger King, and music videos for such artists as M.I.A., Electric Six, DJ Format and Gold Chains.

Early life 
Fleischer was born and raised in Washington, D.C, the son of Karen Lee (née Samuel) and David Elliot Fleischer, who is a physician at the Mayo Clinic in Arizona and a professor of medicine. His brother, Lucas, works in new media. His father was born to a Jewish family, while his mother converted to Judaism. Fleischer was raised in Reform Judaism.

After graduating with a major in history from Wesleyan University, Fleischer moved to San Francisco, where he worked as a freelance HTML programmer, unsure what he wanted to do with his life.

Career
Taking the advice of close friend Mike White (also a  Wesleyan graduate), Fleischer worked as a PA in the writers' office of Dawson's Creek. He eventually turned to directing and worked his way through the industry, tackling music videos and television commercials before landing his first feature film, Zombieland, in 2009. His second feature, 30 Minutes or Less, opened in theaters on August 12, 2011.

Fleischer directed Gangster Squad, a 2013 action thriller film, based on the special tactical group created by the LAPD to combat the Los Angeles crime family. He next directed Venom, a film about Marvel Comics character Eddie Brock, starring Tom Hardy; it was released on October 5, 2018.

In 2019, he directed Zombieland: Double Tap, reuniting the four original leads. In February 2020, he was hired to direct Uncharted, based on the video game series of the same name. In September 2022, he was hired to direct Now You See Me 3.

Filmography

Feature films 

Producer
 Two Night Stand (2014)
 Unicorn Store (2017)
 Bad Trip (2021)

Television

Short films

Music videos

Commercials

Collaborations
Like many directors, Fleischer has worked with certain actors on two or more of his films:

References

External links

1974 births
American music video directors
American Reform Jews
Comedy film directors
Film directors from San Francisco
Film directors from Washington, D.C.
Horror film directors
Living people
Wesleyan University alumni
Writers from San Francisco
Writers from Washington, D.C.